Chief of the Suquamish – Chief Seattle, also known as Bust of Chief Seattle and Chief Seattle Fountain, is a bust depicting Chief Seattle by artist James A. Wehn. It was commissioned by the Seattle Park Board to accommodate the Alaska-Yukon-Pacific Exposition, and initially sat on a fountain for men, dogs and horses.

Versions

The bronze installed at the intersection of First Avenue and Yesler Way in Pioneer Square, Seattle, was created in 1909. It was surveyed and deemed "treatment needed" by the Smithsonian Institution's "Save Outdoor Sculpture!" program in March 1994.

Another version of the bust is installed at Seattle University.

See also
 1909 in art
 Native Americans in popular culture

References

External links
 

1909 establishments in Washington (state)
1909 sculptures
Bronze sculptures in Washington (state)
Busts in Washington (state)
Monuments and memorials in Seattle
Sculptures of Native Americans in Washington (state)
Outdoor sculptures in Seattle
Sculptures of men in Washington (state)
Seattle University campus
World's fair sculptures
Alaska–Yukon–Pacific Exposition